Philippe Lottiaux (born 14 August 1966) is a French politician who has represented the 4th constituency of the Var department in the National Assembly since 2022. He is a member of the National Rally (RN).

Career
Lottiaux, a 1991 graduate of the École nationale d'administration, was a civil servant and the director general of public services in the municipality of Levallois-Perret from 2001 to 2011 under the mayorship of Patrick Balkany.

In the 2014 municipal election, Lottiaux was the candidate leading the National Front (later National Rally) list in the southern city of Avignon. He was elected as a councillor after coming first in the first round, holding a seat until 2017. Later in 2014 he became newly-elected Fréjus Mayor David Rachline's chief of staff. In the 2015 regional election, Lottiaux was also elected to the Regional Council of Provence-Alpes-Côte d'Azur on the list led by Marion Maréchal-Le Pen.

Ahead of the 2022 French legislative election, Lottiaux was selected to contest Var's 4th constituency (having previously contested the seat in 2017); he was successful at winning it, defeating one-term incumbent Sereine Mauborgne of La République En Marche! and challenger Éric Zemmour of Reconquête.

See also 
 List of deputies of the 16th National Assembly of France

References 

Living people
1966 births
Deputies of the 16th National Assembly of the French Fifth Republic
21st-century French politicians
Members of Parliament for Var
National Rally (France) politicians
Members of the Regional Council of Provence-Alpes-Côte d'Azur
French city councillors
21st-century French civil servants
People from Pas-de-Calais
Politicians from Provence-Alpes-Côte d'Azur
Sciences Po alumni
École nationale d'administration alumni